Kennedy Mweene (born 11 December 1984) is a Zambian professional footballer who plays as a goalkeeper for South African Premier Soccer League club Mamelodi Sundowns and the Zambia national team. He is Zambia's most capped player, having represented Zambia more than 120 times.

Club career
Renowned for his penalty-saving and penalty-taking skills, Mweene was arguably one of the best goalkeepers in Africa, winning the PSL Goalkeeper of the Season award (best player in the South African top division) in the 2008-09 season. He played for Free State Stars until the end of the 2012-13 season. On 27 June 2013, he agreed to a three-year deal with Mamelodi Sundowns.

International career
Since being beaten from the spot by Samuel Eto'o at the 2008 Africa Cup of Nations, he has saved every penalty he has been presented with while playing for Zambia. He has been the first-choice goalkeeper for Zambia since making his debut in 2004 and was a participant at the 2006 African Nations Cup, 2008 African Nations Cup, 2010 African Nations Cup and the 2012 African Nations Cup. On 12 February 2012, Mweene kept a clean sheet during the 2012 Africa Cup of Nations Final and saved one penalty kick (as well as successfully converted his own) in the shootout to decide the game, which was eventually won by Zambia. He was chosen as the goalkeeper of the tournament. During the 2013 Africa Cup of Nations Mweene converted a penalty kick, earning a 1–1 draw against Nigeria and also saved two penalties during the tournament.

In 2015, Mweene participated in the sixth edition of the Africa Cup of Nations, the 2015 Africa Cup of Nations, which was the 30th edition of the Africa Cup of Nations and was hosted by Equatorial Guinea from 17 January to 8 February 2015.

Career statistics

Scores and results list Zambia's goal tally first, score column indicates score after each Mweene goal.

Honours
Free State Stars
 Baymed Cup: 2006

Mamelodi Sundowns
 Premier Soccer League (6): 2013–14, 2015–16, 2017-18, 2018-19, 2019-20, 2020-21
 Nedbank Cup: 2015, 2019-20
 Telkom Knockout: 2019
 CAF Champions league: 2016
 CAF Super Cup: 2017
 MTN 8: 2021

Zambia
 Africa Cup of Nations: 2012

See also

List of footballers with 100 or more caps

References

External links
 
 
 kickoff.com

1984 births
Living people
Sportspeople from Lusaka
Zambian footballers
Zambia international footballers
Zambian expatriate footballers
Zambian expatriate sportspeople in South Africa
Association football goalkeepers
Free State Stars F.C. players
Mamelodi Sundowns F.C. players
2006 Africa Cup of Nations players
2008 Africa Cup of Nations players
2010 Africa Cup of Nations players
2012 Africa Cup of Nations players
2013 Africa Cup of Nations players
2015 Africa Cup of Nations players
Expatriate soccer players in South Africa
Africa Cup of Nations-winning players
FIFA Century Club